Fidatevi is the first solo album released by American punk rock band Screeching Weasel frontman Ben Weasel. The album was released on June 18, 2002 on Panic Button Records.

Weasel has said that the lyrics on the album "Are based on experiences or insights gained by practicing secular sitting meditation, as well as ideas I came across and personalized through the study of the works of authors as diverse as Geshe Kelsang Gyatso, Henry David Thoreau, Jon Kabat-Zinn, Pema Chodron, Ralph Waldo Emerson and others."

Track listing
All songs written by Ben Weasel except where noted.

"Patience"
"The True Heart of Love"
"Fidatevi"
"Even Pace"
"The Ship"
"Strangers" (Dave Davies)
"Truth and Beauty"
"Indecision"
"No Expectations"
"Imperfect World" (Ben Weasel, Dan Vapid)
"Responsibility"
"Take Action"
"Water and Waves"
"The Rays of the Sun"

Personnel
Ben Weasel- vocals
Dan Vapid- guitar, bass, backing vocals
Mass Giorgini- production, engineering, mastering
Phillip Hill- assistant engineering, lead guitar on "Take Action"
Devin Davis- keyboards on "Strangers" and "The Rays Of The Sun"

References

2002 debut albums
Ben Weasel albums